Chausson is a French recreational vehicle constructor since 1903 who are part of Groupe Trigano.
The vehicles are sold in 15 European countries
The vehicles are made in France. The plant at Tournon-sur-Rhône employs 835 persons.

During the past, it was part of the larger Société des usines Chausson, bus manufacturer and contractor with several automobile brands.

Gallery

References

External links 

Website of main dealer
Website of the plant

Recreational vehicle manufacturers
Motor vehicle manufacturers of France
Vehicle manufacturing companies established in 1903